KSKD (95.9 FM) was a radio station broadcasting a Regional Mexican music format. Licensed to Livingston, California, United States, the station served the Merced area. The station was owned by KSKD, Inc.

History
The station was assigned the call letters KNTO on October 26, 1981. On February 14, 2002, the station changed its call sign to the KSKD. The license for the station was cancelled on March 20, 2020.

References

External links

SKD
SKD
Mass media in Merced County, California
Radio stations established in 1981
Radio stations disestablished in 2020
Defunct radio stations in the United States
1981 establishments in California
2020 disestablishments in California
SKD